Zuraindey bin Jumai (born 30 March 1980) is a Malaysian footballer from the state of Sabah. Currently he plays for Kedah FA.

Other than his home state team Sabah, Zuraindey also have played for Perlis FA. He also played for Perak FA for the duration of 2012 Malaysia Cup, on loan from Sabah FA.

References

External links
 

1980 births
Living people
Perak F.C. players
Perlis FA players
Sabah F.C. (Malaysia) players
Kedah Darul Aman F.C. players
Malaysia Super League players
Malaysian footballers
People from Sabah
Association football midfielders